Ellen Frances Buttrick  (born 3 August 1995) is a British Paralympic rower who competes in the mixed coxed four.

Buttrick was appointed Member of the Order of the British Empire (MBE) in the 2022 New Year Honours for services to rowing.

Buttrkick studied at Northumbria University for a BSc in Geography. She currently studies at the London School of Economics and Political Science (LSE) where she is undertaking a MSc in Gender, Policy and Inequalities.

References

1995 births
Living people
Sportspeople from Peterborough
British female rowers
Rowers at the 2020 Summer Paralympics
Medalists at the 2020 Summer Paralympics
Paralympic medalists in rowing
Paralympic gold medalists for Great Britain
Members of the Order of the British Empire